Faraaz Ayaaz Hossain was a 20-year-old Bangladeshi Muslim who was murdered in the July 2016 Dhaka attack. He was the grandson of Latifur Rahman, chairman of Transcom Group and Shahnaz Rahman. Faraaz was the younger child of Simeen Rahman and Muhammad Waquer Bin Hossain. Zaraif Ayaat Hossain was his only elder brother. He was studying undergraduate at the Emory University in Atlanta, Georgia, USA and came to Dhaka in mid May to spend his summer holidays.

Education 
Faraaz Hossain started his school at the age of three, at Sir John Wilson, Dhaka and studied there until class 2. Then he went on to join the American International School of Dhaka and graduated in 2014. For higher education Faraaz went on to Emory University in Atlanta in August 2014, where he would then be admitted into Emory's Goizueta Business School. In school at class 5 he received US President's (George W Bush) Education Award for outstanding academic excellence.

Recognition

Mother Teresa Award 
Faraaz Ayaaz Hossain was awarded the Mother Teresa Memorial International Award for 2016 because as a Bangladeshi and a Muslim he was not the terrorists' target, but he refused to abandon his two friends at the restaurant.

Hossain is the first person to be conferred the award posthumously. Faraaz's mother and elder brother Zaraif received the award on his behalf at a ceremony at Mumbai, India.

Garden of the Righteous in Tunisia 
On 15 July 2016, a tree was planted to honour Hossain in the Garden of the Righteous Worldwide, located inside the Italian Embassy in Tunis. The Garden was set up by a non-profit Milan-based organisation with co-operation of the Ministry of Foreign Affairs of Italy. It hosts trees and memorial stones dedicated to righteous Muslim individuals who saved human lives during genocides or massacres and fought against fanaticism.

Faraaz Hossain Courage Award 
PepsiCo has taken the decision to launch the annual "Faraaz Hossain Courage Award" from 2016, to be awarded each year for twenty years. The purpose of the award is to recognise acts of exceptional courage by individuals setting examples of empathy for fellow human beings, to encourage the spirit of bravery among Bangladeshi youth.

In popular culture 

 2019 Bangladeshi-German-Russian co-production film Shonibar Bikel and 2022 Indian film Faraaz depict him.

See also
 July 2016 Dhaka attack

References 

1996 births
2016 deaths
Bangladeshi murder victims
People murdered in Dhaka
Deaths by firearm in Bangladesh
Emory University alumni